Renato Abate (born 25 April 1958), best known as Garbo, is an Italian singer-songwriter and record producer. He is considered one of the most important exponents of Italian new wave music.

Background 
Born in Milan, Garbo made his debut in 1981 with A Berlino... Va Bene, an album influenced by the David Bowie's Berlin Trilogy. The eponymous title-track was released as a single and it was met with critical success. Garbo's two subsequent albums were well received, but the peak of his career came in 1984 with the song "Radioclima". Presented at the Sanremo Music Festival it won the Critics Jury Award. Garbo returned to Sanremo the following year, with the song "Cose veloci". In 1993 he founded his own record label, Discipline, with which he released his later works.

In 2006 Garbo was honored by a tribute album, ConGarbo, where some of his most popular songs were covered by protagonists of the Italian independent music scene such as Baustelle, Delta-V, Krisma, Zu and Meg (former members of 99 Posse), Soerba (Luca Urbani and Gabriele D'Àmora), Andy (from Bluvertigo) and Boosta (from Subsonica).

In 2014 he acted in the film-comedy Sexy Shop.

Discography

Studio albums

1981 - A Berlino... Va Bene 
1982 - Scortati
1984 - Fotografie 
1986 - Il Fiume  
1988 - Manifesti
1990 - 1.6.2
1993 -  Macchine Nei Fiori / Cosa Rimane... Rivisitazioni (81-91)
1995 - Fuori Per Sempre
1997 - Up The Line  
1998 -  Grandi Giorni  
2002 - Blu 
2005 - Gialloelettrico 
2008 -  Come Il Vetro 
2012 -  La Moda

Live albums
1995 -  Garbo e Il Presidente Live

Compilation albums
2007 - The Best - Platinum Collection

Singles

1981 A Berlino...Va Bene
1982 Vorrei Regnare
1983 Generazione
1983 Quanti Anni Hai?
1984 Radioclima
1985 Cose Veloci
1986 Il Fiume
1986 Per Te
1987 Extragarbo
1988 Dal Silenzio
1990 Domani
1993 Ciao/Ciao 31
1998 Grandi Giorni
1998 Un Bacio
2002 Un Bacio Falso
2003 Migliaia Di Rose
2004 Radioclima (Electroclima Mix)
2005 Onda Elettrica
2006 Forse
2006 Giallo 
2007 Grandi Giorni  
2008 Voglio Morire Giovane

References

External links
 *Garbo at Myspace
 

1958 births
Singers from Milan
Italian male singer-songwriters
Italian singer-songwriters
Italian pop singers
Living people
Italian Italo disco musicians
Italian electronic musicians
Italian new wave musicians
Italian record producers